King's Highway 68, commonly referred to as Highway 68, was a provincially maintained highway on Manitoulin Island, linking the island to the mainland. It was connected to the rest of the network at McKerrow, where it met Highway 17. The road was built in the 1920s as a trunk road for the Department of Northern Development (later merged into the Department of Highways, today's Ministry of Transportation), but was assumed as a provincial highway in 1937, as the only King's Highway on the island. Highway 68 stretched from South Baymouth in the south, through the towns of Manitowaning and Little Current north through Espanola on the mainland, before terminating at Highway 17 in McKerrow.

The entire route was later redesignated as an extension of Highway 6 in 1980. It remains part of the provincial highway system under its new designation.

Route description 

Highway 68 was a  route that crossed the eastern side of Manitoulin Island in a north–south orientation between South Baymouth and Little Current. North of there, it travelled through the La Cloche Mountains en route to Espanola and Highway 17. However, in 1980 the route was renumbered as a northern "extension" of Highway 6. The two segments of the highway are connected by the seasonal Chi-Cheemaun ferry service that travels between Tobermory and South Baymouth. This service only operates from May through October.

Today, the former routing is surrounded by farms and ranges outside of the numerous communities it interconnects on Manitoulin Island. On the mainland, the highway passes through mountainous terrain and the rugged Canadian Shield.
Communities along the route include South Baymouth, Squirrel Town, Manitowaning, Sheguiandah, Little Current, McGregor Bay, Whitefish Falls, West River and Espanola.

History 

The history of Highway 68 dates to 1929, when the Department of Northern Development (DND) constructed a  gravel road between McKerrow and Goat Island. From there, a railway and ferry crossed the North Channel to Little Current on Manitoulin Island. On April 1, 1937, the DND merged into the Department of Highways (DHO), and the latter began to assume and number trunk roadways in central and northern Ontario. On August 11, 1937, the DHO took control of the Little Current Road.
At its northern terminus, Highway 17 was rerouted in 1939, bypassing the old alignment between Webbwood and McKerrow.

During World War II, the rail bridge over the North Channel was abandoned, and subsequently redecked for highway use in 1945. However, Manitoulin Island would still remain without a highway of its own until the mid-1950s.

While the road was re-aligned somewhat throughout its history (many of the re-alignments took place in the late 1950s and early 1960s), and its overall path has not changed, its length has varied considerably during re-alignments, creeping as high as 130 km during the 1960s, before settling back down to its current value of around 116 km. Some former alignments (such as "Devil's Elbow Road") are still in use. The road was fully paved by 1973, making this road the second last Kings Highways in the province to be paved in its entirety (with the last being Highway 129).

During the spring of 1980, the entire length of Highway 68 was renumbered as part of Highway 6.
The two discontinuous sections of Highway 6 are linked only by a privately operated ferry, MS Chi-Cheemaun, which crosses Georgian Bay daily from May to October between South Baymouth and Tobermory.

Major intersections

References 

068